P. candida  may refer to:
 Palicourea candida, a plant species endemic to Ecuador
 Partula candida, an extinct gastropod species endemic to French Polynesia
 Piperia candida, the whiteflower rein orchid, slender white piperia or white-flowered piperia, an orchid species native to western North America from Alaska to the San Francisco Bay Area

See also
 Candida (disambiguation)